Ectopoglossus is a genus of frogs in the subfamily Hyloxalinae, of the family Dendrobatidae.

Species 
 Ectopoglossus absconditus Grant, Rada, Anganoy-Criollo, Batista, Dias, Jeckel, Machado & Rueda-Almonacid, 2017
 Ectopoglossus astralogaster (Myers, Ibáñez, Grant & Jaramillo, 2012)
 Ectopoglossus atopoglossus (Grant, Humphrey & Myers, 1997)
 Ectopoglossus confusus (Myers & Grant, 2009)
 Ectopoglossus isthminus (Myers, Ibáñez, Grant & Jaramillo, 2012)
 Ectopoglossus lacrimosus (Myers, 1991)
 Ectopoglossus saxatilis Grant, Rada, Anganoy-Criollo, Batista, Dias, Jeckel, Machado & Rueda-Almonacid, 2017

References 

Poison dart frogs
 
Amphibian genera